Norman Blake/Tut Taylor/Sam Bush/Butch Robins/Vassar Clements/David Holland/Jethro Burns is a studio album recorded by American musicians  Norman Blake, Tut Taylor, Sam Bush, Butch Robins, Vassar Clements, and Jethro Burns and British bassist Dave Holland. It was released in 1975.

From Hank Deane's original liner notes: "Hey, let's do a record in Nashville with everybody. "And Jethro Burns", says Sam. OK, all right, let's do it. I fly to Nashville to see Claude Hill and we do it."

Reception

Ken Dryden, in his Allmusic review states the album "...blur[s] the imaginary lines between jazz and bluegrass even further; after all, a good musician in either field should be a great improviser."

Track listing
"Sweet Georgia Brown" (Ben Bernie, Kenneth Casey, Maceo Pinkard) – 2:53
"Sauerkraut 'N Solar Energy" (Jethro Burns, Vassar Clements, David Holland) – 7:33
"The Old Brown Case" (Norman Blake) – 3:58
"Take the "A" Train" (Duke Ellington, Billy Strayhorn) – 3:36
"Going Home" (Antonín Dvořák) – 3:02
"McKinley's Blues" (Traditional) – 4:21
"Oconee" (Tut Taylor) – 5:26
"Vassar and Dave" (Clements, Holland) – 5:54

Personnel
 Norman Blake – guitar, mandocello, vocals
 Vassar Clements – violin
 Jethro Burns – guitar, mandolin
 Butch Robins – banjo
 Tut Taylor – dobro, mandolin
 Sam Bush – mandola, mandolin
 David Holland – bass
Production notes
Claude J. Hill – engineer
Jim McGuire – photography
Hank Deane – liner notes

References

1975 albums
Norman Blake (American musician) albums
Sam Bush albums
Tut Taylor albums